Elections to Manchester Council were held on Thursday, 6 May 1976. One third of the council was up for election, with each successful candidate to serve a four-year term of office, expiring in 1980. The Labour Party retained overall control of the Council.

Election result

After the election, the composition of the council was as follows:

Ward results

Alexandra

Ardwick

Baguley

Barlow Moor

Beswick

Blackley

Bradford

Brooklands

Burnage

Charlestown

Cheetham

Chorlton

Collegiate Church

Crossacres

Crumpsall

Didsbury

Gorton North

Gorton South

Harpurhey

Hulme

Levenshulme

Lightbowne

Lloyd Street

Longsight

Miles Platting

Moss Side

Moston

Newton Heath

Northenden

Old Moat

Rusholme

Withington

Woodhouse Park

References

1976 English local elections
1976
1970s in Manchester
May 1976 events in the United Kingdom